Kate Næss (30 July 1938 – 15 July 1987) was a Norwegian poet and translator. She was born in Oslo, and was married to theatre director Janken Varden. She made her literary debut in 1962 with the poetry collection Billedskrift. Later collections were Mørkerommet from 1964 and Blindgjengere from 1969. She was among the pioneers of Club 7 in Oslo, and is credited for inventing the name of the club. Poet Jan Erik Vold has labeled her the "secret queen of the sixties".

References

Further reading

1938 births
1987 deaths
Writers from Oslo
20th-century Norwegian poets
20th-century Norwegian translators
Norwegian women poets
20th-century Norwegian women writers